Mark Tompkins may refer to:

 Mark Tompkins (racehorse trainer), British racehorse trainer
 Mark Tompkins (dancer) (born 1954), American-born French artist, dancer and choreographer
 Mark N. Tompkins (born 1975), Canadian-born film and theater painter and scenic artist